The 2022 Pelham Racquet Club Pro Classic was a professional tennis tournament played on outdoor clay courts. It was the eighteenth edition of the tournament which was part of the 2022 ITF Women's World Tennis Tour. It took place in Pelham, Alabama, United States between 16 and 22 May 2022.

Singles main draw entrants

Seeds

 1 Rankings are as of 9 May 2022.

Other entrants
The following players received wildcards into the singles main draw:
  Tatum Evans
  Alexa Graham
  McKenna Schaefbauer
  Jenna Thompson

The following players received entry from the qualifying draw:
  Carolyn Ansari
  Ariana Arseneault
  Cadence Brace
  Līga Dekmeijere
  Joelle Kissell
  Maria Kononova
  Rhiann Newborn
  Almudena Sanz Llaneza Fernández

Champions

Singles

  María Carlé def.  Elvina Kalieva, 6–1, 6–1

Doubles

  Carolyn Ansari /  Ariana Arseneault def.  Reese Brantmeier /  Elvina Kalieva 7–5, 6–1

References

External links
 2022 Pelham Racquet Club Pro Classic at ITFtennis.com
 Official website

2022 ITF Women's World Tennis Tour
2022 in American tennis
May 2022 sports events in the United States
2022 in sports in Alabama